Howard County is the name of seven counties in the United States of America:

 Howard County, Arkansas
 Howard County, Indiana
 Howard County, Iowa
 Howard County, Maryland
 Howard County, Missouri
 Howard County, Nebraska
 Howard County, Texas